Ann Victoria Pennington (born June 3, 1950) is an American model and actress. She was Playboy magazine's Playmate of the Month for its March 1976 issue. Her centerfold was photographed by Pompeo Posar and Phillip Dixon.

Biography
Pennington is the sister of fellow model Janice Pennington, and like Janice, appeared as a model on game shows. Her most notable work was as a regular on Card Sharks, but she also appeared as a substitute in 1976 on the version of The Nighttime Price Is Right hosted by Dennis James. She also appeared in commercials and for photos illustrating stories in Cosmopolitan magazine.

Pennington married Shaun Cassidy, who is eight years younger than her, in December 1979. They had two children together, and divorced in 1993.

Children
Pennington has a daughter, Caitlin, with Shaun Cassidy.

References

External links
 
 

1950 births
Living people
Actresses from Seattle
1970s Playboy Playmates
Game show models
Female models from Washington (state)
21st-century American women